Rosalind Coward is a journalist and writer. She is an Emeritus Professor of journalism at Roehampton University, and a former member of the board of Greenpeace UK (2005–12).

Education 
Coward gained her first degree in English literature from Cambridge University and her PhD from the Thames Polytechnic (now the University of Greenwich) in 1981.

Career 
She has been a columnist for The Guardian since 1992 and was previously a regular contributor to The Observer and Marxism Today. She wrote a regular column for The Guardian's Comment pages between 1995 and 2004. From 2005 to 2008 she was the author of the regular "Looking After Mother" column for the Saturday Guardian'''s Family section, about the problems faced by those caring for people with dementia.

Her career in journalism includes feature writing for many national newspapers and magazines including the London Evening Standard, Daily Mail, Cosmopolitan and the New Statesman.

She is known for her writing on feminist issues and in cultural semiotics. Her books including Female Desire and Our Treacherous Hearts are still widely cited, as is the essay "Are Women's Novels Feminist Novels", originally written for Feminist Review.

She has a strong interest in environmental issues, and writes a regular column for The Ecologist magazine.

 Selected bibliography 
 Books 
 
 
 
 
 
 
 
 
 
 

 Articles 
 
Reprinted as 
 
 
Reprinted as 
 
 

 Further reading 
 
  Archived Guardian'' columns.

References

External links 
 Ros Coward website
 

1952 births
Academics of the University of Roehampton
British feminists
British journalists
Living people